Ethnikos Sageika F.C. is a Greek football club, based in Sageika, Achaea.

The club was founded in 1968. They will play in Football League 2 for the season 2013–14.

History
Founded in 1968 with colors blue and white. It is considered as a natural continuation of Olympiacos Sageika who existing since 1931 as an independent association.

Honors

Domestic Titles and honors
 Achaea Champions: 3
 1990–91, 1997–98, 2008–09
 Achaea Cup Winners: 2
 1973–74, 1974–75

Football clubs in Western Greece